Buntline may refer to:

 Buntline hitch, a knot used for attaching a rope to an object
 Clewlines and buntlines, lines used to handle the sails of a square rigged ship
 Colt Buntline, a long-barreled revolver
 Ned Buntline (1821–1886), an American publisher, journalist, writer, and publicist